In mathematics, the box-counting content is an analog of Minkowski content.

Definition 

Let  be a bounded subset of -dimensional Euclidean space  such that the box-counting dimension  exists.

where  is the maximum number of disjoint closed balls with centers
 and radii .

If , then  is said to be box-counting measurable.

Examples 
Let  denote the unit interval.
Note that the box-counting dimension  and the Minkowski dimension  coincide with a common value of 1; i.e.

See also
Box counting

References 

Fractals